Alan Mauricio Moreno Ávalos (born 30 October 1995) is a Chilean footballer who plays for Deportes Iquique.

References

External links

1995 births
Living people
People from Iquique
People from Iquique Province
People from Tarapacá Region
Chilean footballers
Chilean Primera División players
Primera B de Chile players
Deportes Iquique footballers
Deportes Temuco footballers
Association football midfielders